Anarsia spatulana is a moth in the family Gelechiidae. It was described by Kyu-Tek Park and Margarita Gennadievna Ponomarenko in 1996. It is found in Thailand.

The wingspan is 17–18 mm. The forewings are grey with a large dark brown costal mark. The hindwings are pale grey.

References

spatulana
Moths described in 1996
Moths of Asia